Rufus Rhodes may refer to:

 Rufus N. Rhodes (1856–1910), American journalist
 Rufus Randolph Rhodes (1818–1870), American lawyer and patent officer